"Unbelievable Love" is a single by Canadian country music group Prairie Oyster. Released in 1996, it was the first single from their album Blue Plate Special. The song reached #1 on the RPM Country Tracks chart in November 1996.

Chart performance

Year-end charts

References

1996 songs
1996 singles
Prairie Oyster songs
Songs written by Joan Besen